Hettinger is a city in, and the county seat of, Adams County, North Dakota, United States. The population was 1,074 at the 2020 census.

North Dakota State University operates a livestock research station near Hettinger, which often partners with South Dakota State University's Antelope Range and Livestock Research Station for sheep research.

History
Hettinger was founded in 1907 along the Milwaukee Road's transcontinental rail line known as the Pacific Extension. The city and its surrounding township were named by popular demand in recognition of Hettinger County, from which Adams County was created in 1907.

Geography

Climate
According to the Köppen Climate Classification system, Hettinger has a semi-arid climate, abbreviated "BSk" on climate maps.

Demographics

2000 census
As of the census of 2000, there were 1,307 people, 584 households, and 345 families living in the city. The population density was 1,556.6 people per square mile (600.8/km). There were 720 housing units at an average density of 857.5 per square mile (330.9/km). The racial makeup of the city was 98.78% White, 0.15% African American, 0.38% Native American, 0.15% Asian, 0.08% Pacific Islander, 0.23% from other races, and 0.23% from two or more races. Hispanic or Latino people of any race were 0.38% of the population.

There were 584 households, out of which 25.7% had children under the age of 18 living with them, 47.8% were married couples living together, 8.6% had a female householder with no husband present, and 40.8% were non-families. 38.0% of all households were made up of individuals, and 22.6% had someone living alone who was 65 years of age or older. The average household size was 2.10 and the average family size was 2.76.

In the city, the population was spread out, with 21.7% under the age of 18, 4.8% from 18 to 24, 21.9% from 25 to 44, 23.2% from 45 to 64, and 28.5% who were 65 years of age or older. The median age was 46 years. For every 100 females, there were 80.0 males. For every 100 females age 18 and over, there were 78.1 males.

The median income for a household in the city was $27,689, and the median income for a family was $32,917. Males had a median income of $26,172 versus $19,674 for females. The per capita income for the city was $21,148. About 5.4% of families and 8.1% of the population were below the poverty line, including 8.6% of those under age 18 and 13.7% of those age 65 or over.

2010 census
As of the census of 2010, there were 1,226 people, 587 households, and 316 families living in the city. The racial makeup of the city was 97.4% White, 0.2% African American, 0.7% Native American, 0.7% Asian, and 1.1% from two or more races. Hispanic or Latino people of any race were 0.9% of the population.

There were 587 households, of which 22.8% had children under the age of 18 living with them, 43.6% were married couples living together, 6.5% had a female householder with no husband present, 3.7% had a male householder with no wife present, and 46.2% were non-families. 42.9% of all households were made up of individuals, and 20.6% had someone living alone who was 65 years of age or older. The average household size was 2.00 and the average family size was 2.70.

The median age in the city was 48 years. 19.5% of residents were under the age of 18; 6.4% were between the ages of 18 and 24; 19.6% were from 25 to 44; 29.3% were from 45 to 64; and 25.2% were 65 years of age or older. The gender makeup of the city was 43.2% male and 56.8% female.

Education
Hettinger High School

Media
Radio stations
KNDC and KNDH-FM are the two local stations in town.

Notable people

 Rick Berg, U.S. Congressman
 Patrick Daniel Norton, U.S. Congressman
 Steve Tomac, North Dakota state legislator

References

External links
 City of Hettinger
 Map showing Forest Service lands just south of Hettinger

Cities in Adams County, North Dakota
Cities in North Dakota
County seats in North Dakota
Populated places established in 1907
1907 establishments in North Dakota